The Labèque sisters, Katia (born 11 March 1950) and Marielle (born 6 March 1952), are an internationally known French piano duo.

Biography

Education and first performances 
Katia and Marielle were both born in Bayonne, on the southwest coast of France near the Spanish border (Northern Basque Country). Their father was a doctor, rugby football player and music lover. He sang in the Bordeaux Opera choir. The sisters' first teacher was their Italian mother, Ada Cecchi (a former student of Marguerite Long), who began lessons when her daughters were three and five years of age. Upon graduation in piano from the Conservatoire de Paris in 1968, the two began working on piano four hands and two pianos repertoire. They recorded their first album Les Visions de l'Amen of Olivier Messiaen under the artistic direction of the composer himself. They then undertook performance of contemporary music, performing works by Luciano Berio, Pierre Boulez, Philippe Boesmans, György Ligeti and Olivier Messiaen.

International career
While some degree of recognition came with this performance repertoire, their true celebrity arrived when their 1980 two-piano recording of Gershwin's Rhapsody in Blue sold over a half million copies. Beyond the traditional classical repertoire, their repertoire extends to contemporary classical music, jazz, ragtime, flamenco, minimal music, baroque music on period instruments, and even pop music and experimental rock.

They discovered baroque music with Marco Postinghel and commissioned the construction of two Silberman fortepianos in 1998. They played these instruments with Il Giardino Armonico conducted by Giovanni Antonini, Musica Antiqua Köln conducted by Reinhard Goebel (Johann Sebastian Bach commemoration year in 2000), the English Baroque Soloists conducted by Sir John Eliot Gardiner, the Venice Baroque Orchestra conducted by Andrea Marcon, and with the Orchestra of the Age of Enlightenment conducted by Sir Simon Rattle.

They performed for 33,000 people at the Waldbühne gala concert, the last concert of the 2005 season of the Berlin Philharmonic., and for more than 100,000 people in May 2016 at Schönbrunn Palace with the Vienna Philharmonic conducted by Semyon Bychkov.

Many works have been written especially for them, such as "Linea" for two pianos and percussion by Luciano Berio, "Water Dances" for two pianos by Michael Nyman, "Battlefield" for two pianos and orchestra by Richard Dubugnon, "Nazareno" for two pianos, percussion and orchestra by Osvaldo Golijov and Gonzalo Grau, "The Hague Hacking" for two pianos and orchestra by Louis Andriessen, "Capriccio" by Philippe Boesmans, "Concerto for two pianos and orchestra" by Philip Glass performed in Los Angeles by the Los Angeles Philharmonic conducted by Gustavo Dudamel.

Katia and Marielle have expanded the repertoire for two pianos and percussion with works such as the first instrumental version of West Side Story, transcribed by Irwin Kostal (orchestrator of the original musical), and the version for two pianos and basque percussions of Maurice Ravel's Boléro. They premiered "Four Movements" for two pianos by Philip Glass in France, England, and Italy (where in the summer of 2011 they opened the 48th Edition of the Chamber Music Festival of Cervo, Liguria)    and Cuba. In November 2011, they premiered the project "50 Years of Minimalism" at Kings Place (London) with works of John Cage, David Chalmin, William Duckworth, Arvo Pärt, Michael Nyman, Terry Riley, Steve Reich, Howard Skempton, etc.

Recording career
Between 1970 and 1997, they recorded many albums for Erato (Warner Classics), Philips Records, EMI Classics, Sony Music Entertainment, and Decca Records. They then ceased recording for 10 years before creating their own classical music label KML Recordings in 2007 in Italy. Beyond their own records, they produce young bands and musicians of different musical backgrounds, such as experimental rock (B for Bang DimensionX, Dream House, Red Velvet) and traditional music (Mayte Martin, Kalakan). For example, they produced the first album by Kalakan and they introduced them to their friend Madonna in 2011. After this meeting, the trio participated in her MDNA Tour in 2012. In June 2016 they joined the Deutsche Grammophon record label for the distribution of their record label KML Recordings.

They also created their own foundation in 2005 "Fondazione Katia e Marielle Labèque" in Rome, Italy, with the goals of promoting the relationship between music and image, commissioning new works for two pianos, and supporting experimental music groups. Their first project in 2009 supported the young filmmaker Tal Rosner.

In 2012, they created their own recording studio called "Studio KML", in an ancient school in Rome as a meeting point between all the musicians of their Foundation and the KML Recordings label. Their first recording in this place was the "Minimalist Dream House".

Personal lives
Katia Labèque's boyfriend is David Chalmin, composer, producer and singer/guitarist of the band Triple Sun. She was formerly married to English guitarist John McLaughlin and she was also a member of his band in the early 1980s. Marielle Labèque is married to the conductor Semyon Bychkov. The sisters still live together; they moved to London in 1987, to a palace in Florence in 1993, and since 2005 they have lived in a palace that belonged to the Borgia family of Rome.

Discography

Recordings in duet
 1969 : Olivier Messiaen, Visions De L'Amen
 1970 : Bartok, Sonata for 2 Pianos and Percussion
 1972 : Rachmaninov, 24 Preludes & Suite No. 2
 1972 : Hindemith - Martinu
 1979 : Marius Constant : Psyche
 1980 : Gershwin, Rhapsody In Blue / Piano Concerto In F
 1981 : Brahms, Hungarian dances
 1982 : Scott Joplin, Gladrags
 1983 : Liszt, Réminiscences de Don Juan
 1984 : Rossini, Petite messe solennelle
 1984 : Gershwin, An American in Paris
 1985 : Bizet, Fauré, Ravel
 1987 : Stravinsky, Petrouchka / Concerto For 2 Pianos
 1987 : Gershwin, I got Rhythm - Music for Two Pianos
 1988 : Bernstein, Symphonic dances and songs from West Side Story
 1990 : Love of Colours
 1990 : Dvorak, Slavonic Dances Op. 46 & 72
 1991 : Encore !
 1993 : España !
 1994 : Tchaikovsky, Piano fantasy : music for two pianos
 1996 : En blanc et noir - Debussy Album, including En blanc et noir
 2001 : Brahms - Tchaikovsky - Debussy (compilation album)
 2003 : Piano Fantasy (compilation album - 6 CD box)
 2006 : Maurice Ravel
 2007 : Stravinsky / Debussy
 2007 : Schubert / Mozart
 2009 : Erik Satie
 2010 : The New CD box
 2011 : Gershwin-Bernstein, Rhapsody in Blue - West Side Story
 2011 : Nazareno
 2013 : Minimalist Dream House
 2014 : Sisters
 2016 : Invocations
 2017 : Love Stories
 2018 : Amoria

Recordings with collaborators
 1981 : Gershwin's songs with Barbara Hendricks
 1984 : Prokofiev, Peter and The Wolf and Saint Saëns, Le Carnaval des animaux with Itzhak Perlman and the Israel Philharmonic Orchestra conducted by Zubin Mehta
 1985 : Gershwin, Rhapsody in Blue with the Cleveland Orchestra conducted by Riccardo Chailly
 1985 : Bartók, Sonata for Two Pianos and Percussion; Concerto for Two Pianos, Percussion and Orchestra with the City of Birmingham Symphony Orchestra conducted by sir Simon Rattle
 1988 : John McLaughlin, The Mediterranean Concerto Tracks: Brise de Coeur, Montana, Two Sisters, Until Such Time, Zakir
 1989 : Poulenc, Concerto for 2 Pianos with the Boston Symphony Orchestra conducted by Seiji Ozawa
 1989 : Mozart, Piano Concerti with the Berlin Philharmonic conducted by Semyon Bychkov
 1990 : Mendelssohn / Bruch, Piano Concerti with the Philharmonia Orchestra
 1997 : Carnival with Elton John, Madonna, Paul Simon, James Taylor, Sting, Tina Turner, among others, ...
 2008 : De fuego y de Agua with Mayte Martín
 2009 : Katia Labèque Shape Of My Heart
 2016 : Double Concerto For Two Pianos And Orchestra  with the Los Angeles Philharmonic conducted by Gustavo Dudamel
 2016 : Summer Night Concert with the Vienna Philharmonic conducted by Semyon Bychkov

Filmography
 1990 : The Loves of Emma Bardac, telefilm by Thomas Mowrey
 2000 : The Italian Bach in Vienna, concert with Il Giardino Armonico
 2000 : The Man Who Cried, film by Sally Potter
 2005 : Waldbühne 2005, concert with the Berlin Philharmonic conducted by Sir Simon Rattle
 2005 : I'm Going to Tell You a Secret, documentary about Madonna
 2012 : The Labeque way, documentary by Felix Cabez
 2016 : Summer Night Concert, concert with the Vienna Philharmonic conducted by Semyon Bychkov

Bibliography
 2016: Une vie à quatre mains, Renaud Machart, Buchet/Chastel,

References

External links
 Official website
 Fondation KML
 KML recordings
 , WNCN-FM, October 29, 1982

EMI Classics and Virgin Classics artists
Deutsche Grammophon artists
20th-century French women classical pianists
21st-century French women classical pianists
Sibling musical duos
Classical piano duos
Living people
People from Bayonne
French people of Italian descent
Conservatoire de Paris alumni
1950 births
1952 births